Selenichnites (‘moon track’) is a Cambrian to Jurassic trace fossil that has been found on every continent. It consists of crescent-shaped impressions interpreted as resting or burrowing traces of Xiphosura (extinct relatives of horseshoe crabs).

The ichnogenus was originally named Selenichnus in 1987 by M. Romano and M. Whyte, but these investigators renamed it as Selenichnites in 1990 after it was pointed out that the name Selenichnus was already in use for a genus of reptile trace fossils.

References

Arthropod trace fossils
Xiphosura